Lyman and Asenath Hoyt House is a historic home located at Lancaster Township, Jefferson County, Indiana, and owned by the non-profit group, Historic Eleutherian College Incorporated. Built about 1850, the two-story, rectangular, limestone dwelling has Greek Revival-style design elements. Its front facade has gable roof and a deep-set wooden entry door.

The house is believed to have been an active stop on the Underground Railroad in Indiana from Madison, Indiana on the Ohio River to Indianapolis, Indiana. Lyman Hoyt, along with other local abolitionists and Reverend Thomas Craven, was also a founder of Eleutherian Institute in 1848. The present-day Hoyt home is private residence and is not open to the public. The Hoyt house was listed on the National Register of Historic Places in 2003.

References

Underground Railroad in Indiana
Houses on the National Register of Historic Places in Indiana
Greek Revival houses in Indiana
Houses completed in 1850
Houses in Jefferson County, Indiana
National Register of Historic Places in Jefferson County, Indiana